

19001–19100 

|-id=002
| 19002 Tongkexue ||  || TongKe Xue, ISEF awardee in 2003 || 
|-id=003
| 19003 Erinfrey ||  || Erin Lynn Frey, ISEF awardee in 2003 || 
|-id=004
| 19004 Chirayath ||  || Ved Chirayath, ISEF awardee in 2003 || 
|-id=005
| 19005 Teckman ||  || Megan Elizabeth Teckman, ISEF awardee in 2003 || 
|-id=007
| 19007 Nirajnathan ||  || Niraj Rama Nathan, ISEF awardee in 2003 || 
|-id=008
| 19008 Kristibutler ||  || Kristin L. Butler, ISEF awardee in 2003 || 
|-id=009
| 19009 Galenmaly ||  || Galen Daniel Maly, ISEF awardee in 2003 || 
|-id=017
| 19017 Susanlederer ||  || Susan M. Lederer (born 1970), American planetary scientist and assistant professor of physics || 
|-id=019
| 19019 Sunflower || 2000 SB || Sunflower Observatory † || 
|-id=022
| 19022 Penzel ||  || Edgar Penzel, ISEF awardee in 2003 || 
|-id=023
| 19023 Varela ||  || Elizabeth Van Cortlandt Varela, ISEF awardee in 2003 || 
|-id=025
| 19025 Arthurpetron ||  || Arthur Joseph Petron, ISEF awardee in 2003 || 
|-id=029
| 19029 Briede ||  || Paul Briede, ISEF awardee in 2003 || 
|-id=034
| 19034 Santorini || 2554 P-L || Santorini, a Greek island in the Aegean Sea. || 
|-id=066
| 19066 Ellarie || 4068 T-2 || Ella Marie (Ellarie) Chase Rosales (born 1966) of Jalisco, Mexico, is a close family friend of astronomer Daniel W. E. Green, who made the identifications for this minor planet || 
|-id=079
| 19079 Hernández || 1967 KC || José Hernández, Argentinian gaucho poet || 
|-id=080
| 19080 Martínfierro || 1970 JB || Martín Fierro, fictitious Argentinian hero of the poems by José Hernández || 
|-id=081
| 19081 Mravinskij ||  || Evgenii Mravinskii, (1903–1988), an outstanding Russian musician and conductor. || 
|-id=082
| 19082 Vikchernov || 1976 QS || Viktor Mikhailovich Chernov (1902–1984), a Ukrainian astronomer who obtained valuable new results on variable stars, on the dependence of brightness and color of lunar eclipses on solar activity, as well as on transient lunar phenomena || 
|-id=083
| 19083 Mizuki ||  || Mizuki is an ancient Japanese castle built in Chikushi (now Fukuoka city) in Fukuoka Prefecture in 664. The base of the castle was 1 km by 80 m. || 
|-id=084
| 19084 Eilestam ||  || Olle Eilestam (born 1966) is an entertainer and piano player with a large repertoire of different music. || 
|-id=096
| 19096 Leonfridman ||  || Architect Leonid Osherovich Fridman (born 1948), director of the Crimean Institute of Design, Architect and Restoration. || 
|}

19101–19200 

|-id=119
| 19119 Dimpna ||  || The Dictionary of Minor Planet Names which was edited by astronomer Lutz Schmadel || 
|-id=120
| 19120 Doronina ||  || Actress Tat'yana Vasil'evna Doronina (born 1933) created splendid roles for both stage and screen. She worked in the largest Leningrad and Moscow theaters and since 1992 has been leader of the Moscow Art Academic Gorky Theatre. She was awarded People's artist of Russia (1969) and of the U.S.S.R. (1975). || 
|-id=122
| 19122 Amandabosh ||  || Amanda S. Bosh (born 1965), a lecturer in the Department of Earth, Atmospheric, and Planetary Sciences at the Massachusetts Institute of Technology. || 
|-id=123
| 19123 Stephenlevine ||  || Stephen E. Levine (born 1965), an astronomer at Lowell Observatory, is the Discovery Channel Telescope Commissioning Scientist. || 
|-id=126
| 19126 Ottohahn || 1987 QW || Otto Hahn (1879–1968), German chemist and Nobel Laureate in 1944 || 
|-id=127
| 19127 Olegefremov ||  || Oleg Efremov, chief producer and actor of Sovremennik. || 
|-id=129
| 19129 Loos ||  || Adolf Loos, Austrian architect || 
|-id=130
| 19130 Tytgat ||  || Edgard Tytgat, 19th/20th-century Belgian expressionist painter || 
|-id=132
| 19132 Le Clézio ||  || French-Mauritian novelist of more than 30 novels, J. M. G. Le Clézio (born 1940) is particularly well known for his Voyage to Rodrigues. He was awarded the 2008 Nobel Prize for Literature based on his "authorship of new departures, poetic adventure and sensual ecstasy" || 
|-id=135
| 19135 Takashionaka || 1988 XQ || Takashi Onaka (born 1952) is a professor of infrared astronomy at the University of Tokyo. He is known for his comprehensive study of the interplanetary, circumstellar and interstellar dust based on ground-based/space-borne observations, theoretical approaches and laboratory experiments. || 
|-id=136
| 19136 Strassmann ||  || Fritz Strassmann (1902–1980), German chemist || 
|-id=137
| 19137 Copiapó ||  || Copiapó, a mining district in northern Chile, was in 2010 the scene of a severe mining accident, with 33 miners buried alive at a depth of almost 700 meters for more than two months. They were finally rescued alive and healthy || 
|-id=139
| 19139 Apian ||  || Peter Apian (1495–1552), a German mathematician and cartographer. || 
|-id=140
| 19140 Jansmit ||  || Jan Smit (born 1948), Dutch geologist and paleontologist || 
|-id=141
| 19141 Poelkapelle ||  || Poelkapelle, a village in West Flanders near the city of Ypres. || 
|-id=142
| 19142 Langemarck ||  || Langemarck, a village in West Flanders. || 
|-id=148
| 19148 Alaska ||  || Alaska || 
|-id=149
| 19149 Boccaccio ||  || Giovanni Boccaccio (1313–1375), an Italian poet and essayist. || 
|-id=155
| 19155 Lifeson ||  || Alex Lifeson (Alexander Zivojinovich), Canadian guitarist and co-founder of the band Rush and an Officer of the Order of Canada || 
|-id=156
| 19156 Heco ||  || Joseph Heco (Hikozo Hamada, 1837–1897) was born in Harima town, Hyogo prefecture. He survived a shipwreck in 1851, was taken to the US and became one of the first Japanese to become a US citizen. Returning to Japan, he published the first Japanese newspaper, while Japan was still closed to the outside world || 
|-id=159
| 19159 Taenakano || 1990 TT || Tae Nakano (born 1975) plays an active part as a planetarian in the Kita-Kyushu Children's Culture and Science Museum and a researcher in the Kyushu Institute of Technology. She also undertakes outreach activities with nano-satellites. || 
|-id=160
| 19160 Chikayoshitomi ||  || Chika Yoshitomi (born 1981) plays an active part as an astronomy communicator in Kyushu, Japan. She has worked at Hoshi no Bunka Kan, Tachibana Observatory and Kasuga-ciry Hoshi no Yakata, and has brought up many "little" astronomers. || 
|-id=161
| 19161 Sakawa ||  || The Japanese town of Sakawa in the Kochi prefecture with a population of 20,000, known for brewing a famous brand of sake. It has produced many noted politicians, scientists, and musicians, including Masamitsu Yamasaki, who discovered comet 27P/Crommelin independently in 1928. || 
|-id=162
| 19162 Wambsganss ||  || Joachim Wambsganss (born 1961), a German astronomer. || 
|-id=165
| 19165 Nariyuki || 1991 CD || Kiyoshi Nariyuki (born 1960) has played an active part in astronomical clubs in his area, often becoming their leader in his pursuit of amateur astronomy over the past 30 years. A 0.25-m telescope is installed in the private observatory he completed in 2005. || 
|-id=173
| 19173 Virginiaterése ||  || Virginia Terése Bogdanovich, American amateur astronomer, who assisted in organizing the photographic glass plate archive of the 1.2-m Schmidt Oschin Telescope at Palomar Observatory || 
|-id=175
| 19175 Peterpiot ||  || Peter Piot (born 1949), a Belgian physician, co-discovered the ebola virus in Zaire in 1976. || 
|-id=178
| 19178 Walterbothe ||  || Walter Bothe, A professor at Berlin, Giessen and Heidelberg. || 
|-id=182
| 19182 Pitz ||  || Eckhart Pitz (born 1940), a German physicist at the Heidelberg Max-Planck-Institut für Astronomie. He is a leading expert in astronomical instrumentation, from the extreme ultraviolet to the far infrared. || 
|-id=183
| 19183 Amati ||  || The Amati family of violin makers worked in Cremona in the sixteenth and seventeenth centuries. || 
|-id=185
| 19185 Guarneri ||  || The Guarneri family of violin makers was active in Cremona for several generations. || 
|-id=188
| 19188 Dittebesard || 1991 YT || Ditte Besard (1977–2010), eldest daughter of Camilla and artist Hugo Besard, died after a struggle over many years. Implicitly remembering the goddess Eunomia, her father expressed his feelings as follows: Hour after hour, day after day, time comes downwards like falling snow and covers the present with a carpet || 
|-id=189
| 19189 Stradivari ||  || Antonio Stradivari, Italian violin maker. || 
|-id=190
| 19190 Morihiroshi ||  || Hiroshi Mori (born 1958), a Japanese amateur astronomer, is one of the members of the Yamaneko Group of Comet Observers. || 
|-id=197
| 19197 Akasaki || 1992 EO || Yuka Akasaki (born 1960) has been a coach at a swimming school in Nankoku city for more than 20 years and has coached many excellent swimmers. She herself competes in Japanese Masters' swimming competitions. || 
|}

19201–19300 

|-id=204
| 19204 Joshuatree || 1992 ME || Joshua Tree National Park, founded in 1936 as Joshua Tree National Monument largely through the efforts of Minerva Hoyt (1866–1945). || 
|-id=208
| 19208 Starrfield || 1992 RW || Sumner Starrfield (born 1940), American astronomer || 
|-id=210
| 19210 Higayoshihiro ||  || Yoshihiro Higa (1965–2015) was an amateur astronomer and science communicator. He created the first astronomical science cafe in Sendai, Japan. He was also an amateur meteor researcher. || 
|-id=224
| 19224 Orosei ||  || Roberto Orosei (born 1968), Italian astronomer and contributor to ESA-missions || 
|-id=226
| 19226 Peiresc ||  || Nicolas-Claude Fabri de Peiresc (1580–1637), a French humanist and philosopher with a great interest in astronomy. || 
|-id=228
| 19228 Uemuraikuo ||  || Ikuo Uemura (born 1940) is a passionate and leading member of his local astronomical club Pleiades. || 
|-id=230
| 19230 Sugazi || 1993 TU || Sugazi Tanaka (born 1947), Japanese astronomer and director of the Inagawa Observatory || 
|-id=234
| 19234 Victoriahibbs ||  || Victoria Pavin Hibbs (born 1954) has been known to the discoverer since her birth. She is now a learning specialist for children in science and mathematics and a water color installation artist. || 
|-id=235
| 19235 van Schurman ||  || Anna Maria van Schurman (1607–1678) was the first female student at the University of Utrecht, although she was obliged to follow the courses from behind a curtain. Excelling in many disciplines, she was one of the most intellectual women in Europe. A true polyglot, she corresponded actively with scholars around the world || 
|-id=243
| 19243 Bunting ||  || John Bunting, Scottish born Australian geologist, discovered Yarrabubba impact structure in Western Australia || 
|-id=250
| 19250 Poullain ||  || François Poullain de la Barre (1647–1725) was a French priest, writer, and Cartesian and feminist philosopher. In 1673 he published a radical and philosophically-sophisticated defense of the equality of women and men. || 
|-id=251
| 19251 Totziens ||  || Tot ziens!, Dutch for 'Au revoir'; the discovery was made shortly after the 1994 IAU meeting in The Hague † || 
|-id=258
| 19258 Gongyi ||  || Gongyi, Henan, People's Republic of China || 
|-id=262
| 19262 Lucarubini ||  || Luca Rubini (1980–2014) was an entrepreneur, astronomy enthusiast, science communicator and expert astrophotographer. The high-quality deep-sky images he produced have been published in specialized journals. || 
|-id=263
| 19263 Lavater ||  || Johann Kaspar Lavater (1741–1801), a Swiss writer, clergyman and religious philosopher. || 
|-id=268
| 19268 Morstadt || 1995 UZ || Josef Morstadt (1797–1869), a Czech astronomer, physicist and mathematician. || 
|-id=282
| 19282 Zhangcunhao ||  || Zhang Cunhao (born 1928) is an Academician of the Chinese Academy of Sciences and an Academician of the Academy of Sciences for the Developing World. || 
|-id=287
| 19287 Paronelli ||  || Fede Paronelli, Italian philosopher and astronomer, lecturer at Hoepli planetarium † || 
|-id=288
| 19288 Egami ||  || Katsunori Egami (born 1959) is the leader of the astronomical volunteers at the Fukuoka Science Museum. || 
|-id=290
| 19290 Schroeder ||  || Jeff Schroeder (born 1954) has contributed to the mechanical design and fabrication of all the NEAT cameras, starting with the 1995 NEAT/GEODSS camera, continuing with the 2000 NEAT/MSSS camera and concluding with the 2001 NEAT/Oschin camera. He has worked at the Jet Propulsion Laboratory at JPL for 22 years. || 
|-id=291
| 19291 Karelzeman || 1996 LF || Karel Zeman (1910–1989), a Czech filmmaking genius and experimentator. || 
|-id=293
| 19293 Dedekind || 1996 OF || Richard Dedekind (1831–1916), a German mathematician and also an accomplished pianist and cellist. || 
|-id=294
| 19294 Weymouth || 1996 PF || John Weymouth (born 1922), professor emeritus of physics at the University of Nebraska. || 
|-id=298
| 19298 Zhongkeda ||  || Zhongguokeda, native name of the  University of Science and Technology of China || 
|}

19301–19400 

|-id=303
| 19303 Chinacyo ||  || Chinacyo town is on Okinoerabujima island, one of the Amami Islands, in Kagoshima Prefecture in the southern Japan. || 
|-id=306
| 19306 Voves ||  || Voves is a French town, located in the Beauce natural region, Eure-et-Loir department || 
|-id=307
| 19307 Hanayama ||  || Hidekazu Hanayama (born 1977) is an astronomer at the National Astronomical Observatory of Japan. He works on observational studies of transient objects with the Murikabushi 1.05-m reflector at the Ishigakijima Astronomical Observatory and discovered a secondary nuclear condensation of comet 213P/Van Ness. || 
|-id=310
| 19310 Osawa ||  || Osawa, meaning big dale, is the name of the area in the southwestern part of Mitaka City where the National Observatory is located. || 
|-id=313
| 19313 Shibatakazunari ||  || Kazunari Shibata (born 1954) is a professor at Kyoto University, and has served as director of Kwasan and Hida Observatories for 15 years. He has contributed to the understanding of the basic magnetohydrodynamic mechanism of jets and  ares on the Sun, stars, accretion disks, and active galactic nuclei. || 
|-id=314
| 19314 Nakamuratetsu ||  || Tetsu Nakamura (1946–2019) was a Japanese medical doctor who worked for the Afghan people and who was gunned down on his way to his project site in Afghanistan. He started providing medical services for leprosy patients in 1984, and later for Afghan refugees in Peshawar, Pakistan. || 
|-id=318
| 19318 Somanah ||  || Radhakhrishna Dinesh Somanah, Mauritian professor of physics and astrophysics and one of three pioneers of professional astronomy in the republic. || 
|-id=331
| 19331 Stefanovitale ||  || Stefano Vitale (born 1951) is a full professor of Physics at University of Trento. He is the PI of the LISA Technology Package payload on board the LISA Pathfinder mission of the ESA, launched in 2015 as a precursor to a space-borne gravitational wave observatory. || 
|-id=348
| 19348 Cueca ||  || The cueca, the complex national dance of Chile, dates to around 1824. Partners mimic movements of rooster and hen in courting, holding and waving a white handkerchief in the right hand, dancing to guitar music, voices, drums and clapping. The name was suggested by J. Montani || 
|-id=349
| 19349 Denjoy ||  || Arnaud Denjoy (1884–1974) was one of a group of French mathematicians (including Baire, Borel and Lebesgue) who in the early twentieth century initiated a new approach to the theory of functions of real variables, measure theory and integration. || 
|-id=353
| 19353 Pierrethierry ||  || Pierre Thierry (born 1950) has built equipment designed for making astronomical observations. He created the Association des Utilisateurs de Détecteurs Electroniques in 1994 || 
|-id=354
| 19354 Fredkoehler ||  || Frederic Koehler (born 1994), ISTS awardee in 2012 || 
|-id=355
| 19355 Merpalehmann ||  || Meredith Paloma Lehmann (born 1995), ISTS awardee in 2012 || 
|-id=364
| 19364 Semafor ||  || Theatre Semafor was a special phenomenon of Prague cultural life in the 1960s, with leading personalities Jirí Suchý (born 1931) and Jirí Slitr (1924–1969). Many of their songs became popular and they can be still heard by campfires. || 
|-id=366
| 19366 Sudingqiang ||  || Su Ding-qiang (born 1936), an astronomer and optical engineering expert, made many creative contributions to Chinese astronomical instruments, including a new idea to apply active optics to obtain the shape of a changeable optical system that could not be realized in the conventional way || 
|-id=367
| 19367 Pink Floyd ||  || Pink Floyd, an influential English progressive rock group. || 
|-id=370
| 19370 Yukyung ||  || Yuk Yung (born 1946), a Caltech planetary scientist. || 
|-id=379
| 19379 Labrecque ||  || Steve LaBrecque (born 1964) was responsible for the successful installation and operations of the NEAT/MSSS camera in 2000. At the Jet Propulsion Laboratory he has also worked on the Mars orbital camera. Earlier he developed and serviced shipboard oceanographic equipment at the Lamont Doherty Geological Observatory. || 
|-id=383
| 19383 Rolling Stones ||  || The Rolling Stones are the longest lasting rock-and-roll group, embarking on their fortieth anniversary of great music. || 
|-id=384
| 19384 Winton ||  || Nicholas Winton, rescuer of 669 Jewish children †  || 
|-id=386
| 19386 Axelcronstedt ||  || Axel Fredrik Cronstedt (1722–1765), a mining expert and director of mines in central Sweden, discovered the new element nickel in minerals he found in Hälsingland. Using phosphorus salts and the blowpipe technique he qualitatively analyzed colored metallic oxides || 
|-id=392
| 19392 Oyamada ||  || Hiroyuki Oyamada (born 1970), an amateur astronomer and a member of the Chokainomori Astronomy Club in Sakata, Yamagata, Japan. || 
|-id=393
| 19393 Davidthompson ||  || David Thompson (1770–1857), a British-Canadian furtrader and surveyor, mapped 3.9 million square kilometers of North America. Navigating the full length of the Columbia River in 1811, he produced a high-quality map of the river basin. He has been called the greatest land geographer who ever lived || 
|-id=395
| 19395 Barrera ||  || Luis Barrera (born 1965) is head of the Institute for Astronomy of the Universidad Catholica del Norte in Antofagasta. || 
|-id=397
| 19397 Lagarini ||  || Andrea Lagarini (born 1963) is an assistant in the science department of the European Southern Observatory in Santiago de Chile. || 
|-id=398
| 19398 Creedence ||  || Creedence Clearwater Revival, frequently referred to as CCR or simply "Creedence", was an American rock band that gained popularity in the late 1960s and early 1970s || 
|-id=400
| 19400 Emileclaus ||  || Emile Claus (1849–1924), was a Belgian Flemish painter, known for his landscapes, especially from and around the Lys river. Influenced by Claude Monet, he developed his own impressionism and is now considered the leader of the Belgian Luminism movement. Among his most famous paintings is De Ijsvogels (1891) || 
|}

19401–19500 

|-id=407
| 19407 Standing Bear ||  || Arrested for refusing to be moved to Indian Territory, Standing Bear (1834–1908) petitioned the U.S. District Court in Omaha, Nebraska, in 1879 by writ of habeas corpus. The trial led to the decision that Native Americans are "persons within the meaning of the law" and have the rights of citizenship. || 
|-id=410
| 19410 Guisard ||  || Stéphane Guisard (born 1970), an optician at the European Southern Observatory in Cerro Paranal, where he is working on the Very Large Telescope, including the very complex interferometer. || 
|-id=411
| 19411 Collinarnold ||  || Collin David Arnold, ISEF awardee in 2003 || 
|-id=413
| 19413 Grantlewis ||  || Grant Allen Lewis, ISEF awardee in 2003 || 
|-id=415
| 19415 Parvamenon ||  || Parvathy Rama Menon, ISEF awardee in 2003 || 
|-id=416
| 19416 Benglass ||  || Benjamin William Glass, ISEF awardee in 2003 || 
|-id=417
| 19417 Madelynho ||  || Madelyn Meng-Ling Ho, ISEF awardee in 2003 || 
|-id=419
| 19419 Pinkham ||  || Brian Edward Pinkham, ISEF awardee in 2003 || 
|-id=420
| 19420 Vivekbuch ||  || Vivek Paresh Buch, ISEF awardee in 2003 || 
|-id=421
| 19421 Zachulett ||  || Zachary Frank Hulett, ISEF awardee in 2003 || 
|-id=423
| 19423 Hefter ||  || Jonathan S. Hefter, ISEF awardee in 2003 || 
|-id=424
| 19424 Andrewsong ||  || Andrew Joshua Song, ISEF awardee in 2003 || 
|-id=425
| 19425 Nicholasrapp ||  || Nicholas Dorian Rapp, ISEF awardee in 2003 || 
|-id=426
| 19426 Leal ||  || Eddy Leal, ISEF awardee in 2003 || 
|-id=428
| 19428 Gracehsu ||  || Grace Hsu, ISEF awardee in 2003 || 
|-id=429
| 19429 Grubaugh ||  || Daniel Boyd Grubaugh, ISEF awardee in 2003 || 
|-id=430
| 19430 Kristinaufer ||  || Kristina Ann Ufer, ISEF awardee in 2003 || 
|-id=433
| 19433 Naftz ||  || Douglas Calvin Naftz, ISEF awardee in 2003 || 
|-id=434
| 19434 Bahuffman ||  || Benjamin Allen Huffman, ISEF awardee in 2003 || 
|-id=436
| 19436 Marycole ||  || Mary Elizabeth Cole, ISEF awardee in 2003 || 
|-id=437
| 19437 Jennyblank ||  || Jennifer Renee Blank, ISEF awardee in 2003 || 
|-id=438
| 19438 Khaki ||  || Shirin Khaki, ISEF awardee in 2003 || 
|-id=439
| 19439 Allisontjong ||  || Allison Krystle Weili Tjong], ISEF awardee in 2003 || 
|-id=440
| 19440 Sumatijain ||  || Sumati Kumari Jain, ISEF awardee in 2003 || 
|-id=441
| 19441 Trucpham ||  || Truc Thanh Pham, ISEF awardee in 2003 || 
|-id=442
| 19442 Brianrice ||  || Brian Todd Rice, ISEF awardee in 2003 || 
|-id=443
| 19443 Yanzhong ||  || Yan Zhong, ISEF awardee in 2003 || 
|-id=444
| 19444 Addicott ||  || Charles Michael Addicott, ISEF awardee in 2003 || 
|-id=446
| 19446 Muroski ||  || Megan Elizabeth Muroski, ISEF awardee in 2003 || 
|-id=447
| 19447 Jessicapearl ||  || Jessica Pearl Swartz, ISEF awardee in 2003 || 
|-id=448
| 19448 Jenniferling ||  || Jennifer Shui-Ming Ling, ISEF awardee in 2003 || 
|-id=450
| 19450 Sussman ||  || Gene Everett Sussman, ISEF awardee in 2003 || 
|-id=452
| 19452 Keeney ||  || Chelsea Ray Keeney, ISEF awardee in 2003 || 
|-id=453
| 19453 Murdochorne ||  || Richard Murdoch and Kenneth Horne, British comedians. || 
|-id=454
| 19454 Henrymarr ||  || Henry Louis Marr, ISEF awardee in 2003 || 
|-id=456
| 19456 Pimdouglas ||  || Pim (1995–2001), son of Nigel and Jantina Douglas, enjoyed a brief life and brought joy to his family. This minor planet was discovered on his third birthday. || 
|-id=457
| 19457 Robcastillo ||  || Roberto Castillo (born 1961) works at the European Southern Observatory's Paranal site, where he takes care of several instruments. He also builds telescopes for amateurs, and it is said that half the amateur telescopes in Chile have been constructed by him. || 
|-id=458
| 19458 Legault ||  || Thierry Legault (born 1962), an amateur astronomer. || 
|-id=461
| 19461 Feingold ||  || Samantha Megan Feingold, ISEF awardee in 2003 || 
|-id=462
| 19462 Ulissedini ||  || Ulisse Dini, an Italian mathematician. || 
|-id=463
| 19463 Emilystoll ||  || Emily Erin Stoll, ISEF awardee in 2003 || 
|-id=464
| 19464 Ciarabarr ||  || Ciara Ann Barr, ISEF awardee in 2003 || 
|-id=465
| 19465 Amandarusso ||  || Amanda Maria Russo, ISEF awardee in 2003 || 
|-id=466
| 19466 Darcydiegel ||  || Darcy Renee Diegel, ISEF awardee in 2003 || 
|-id=467
| 19467 Amandanagy ||  || Amanda Mychal Nagy, ISEF awardee in 2003 || 
|-id=470
| 19470 Wenpingchen ||  || Wen Ping Chen (born 1958) leads the National Central University of Taiwan's participation in the Taiwan-American Occultation Survey (TAOS), the goal of which is to map the distribution of small transneptunian objects || 
|-id=473
| 19473 Marygardner ||  || Mary Melissa Gardner, ISEF awardee in 2003 || 
|-id=475
| 19475 Mispagel ||  || Heather Michelle Mispagel, ISEF awardee in 2003 || 
|-id=476
| 19476 Denduluri ||  || Aditya Krishna Denduluri, ISEF awardee in 2003 || 
|-id=477
| 19477 Teresajentz ||  || Teresa Lorraine Jentz, ISEF awardee in 2003 || 
|-id=478
| 19478 Jaimeflores ||  || Jaime Eduardo Flores, ISEF awardee in 2003 || 
|-id=482
| 19482 Harperlee ||  || Harper Lee (1926–2016), an American novelist. || 
|-id=484
| 19484 Vanessaspini ||  || Vanessa Anne Spini, ISEF awardee in 2003 || 
|-id=487
| 19487 Rosscoleman ||  || Ross Andrew Coleman, ISEF awardee in 2003 || 
|-id=488
| 19488 Abramcoley ||  || Abram Levi Coley, ISEF awardee in 2003 || 
|-id=494
| 19494 Gerbs ||  || James ("Gerbs") Bauer (born 1968) studies the physical nature of Centaurs and other outer solar system bodies. || 
|-id=495
| 19495 Terentyeva ||  || Alexandra K. Terentyeva (born 1933) has been a meteor astronomer for more than 50 years at the Institute of Astronomy of the Russian Academy of Sciences. . || 
|-id=496
| 19496 Josephbarone ||  || Joseph Michael Barone, ISEF awardee in 2003 || 
|-id=497
| 19497 Pineda ||  || Maria Luisa Pineda, ISEF awardee in 2003 || 
|-id=499
| 19499 Eugenybiryukov ||  || Eugeny Biryukov (born 1979), a lecturer at South Ural State University in Chelyabinsk, Russia. || 
|-id=500
| 19500 Hillaryfultz ||  || Hillary Anne Fultz, ISEF awardee in 2003 || 
|}

19501–19600 

|-id=504
| 19504 Vladalekseev ||  || Vladmimir Alekseev (born 1935), Russian physicist, who has conducted ground radar investigations of the Tunguska site || 
|-id=509
| 19509 Niigata ||  || Niigata prefecture is located on the island of Honshu, Japan. || 
|-id=517
| 19517 Robertocarlos ||  || Roberto Carlos Braga, Brazilian pop singer || 
|-id=518
| 19518 Moulding ||  || Erin Louise Moulding, ISEF awardee in 2003 || 
|-id=521
| 19521 Chaos ||  || Chaos (cosmogony) || 
|-id=523
| 19523 Paolofrisi ||  || Paolo Frisi (1728–1784), famous Italian scientist, was an authority in the fields of mathematics, physics and astronomy. || 
|-id=524
| 19524 Acaciacoleman ||  || Acacia Coleman is the granddaughter of the discoverer. || 
|-id=528
| 19528 Delloro ||  || Aldo Dell'Oro (born 1971), Italian astronomer || 
|-id=531
| 19531 Charton ||  || Heather Anne Charton, ISEF awardee in 2003 || 
|-id=533
| 19533 Garrison ||  || Carly Beth Garrison, ISEF awardee in 2003 || 
|-id=534
| 19534 Miyagi ||  || Miyagi, a Japanese prefecture in the Tohoku region of Honshu. || 
|-id=535
| 19535 Rowanatkinson ||  || Rowan Sebastian Atkinson (born 1955), one of Britain's finest comedy actors of the last two decades, was inspired by the work of Jacques Tati and John Cleese. Whether the comedy is verbal, as in the television series Blackadder, or physical, as in Mr. Bean, Atkinson is always brilliant. || 
|-id=539
| 19539 Anaverdu ||  || Ana Verdu, wife of Catalan discoverer Jaume Nomen || 
|-id=542
| 19542 Lindperkins ||  || Lindsay Prentice Perkins, ISEF awardee in 2003 || 
|-id=543
| 19543 Burgoyne ||  || Nicole Burgoyne, ISEF awardee in 2003 || 
|-id=544
| 19544 Avramkottke ||  || Avram Kottke, an IFAA recipient in 2003 † || 
|-id=547
| 19547 Collier ||  || Theresa Collier, an IFAA recipient in 2003 † || 
|-id=550
| 19550 Samabates ||  || Samantha Lee Bates, a DCYSC awardee in 2003 || 
|-id=551
| 19551 Peterborden ||  || Peter Young Borden, a DCYSC awardee in 2003 || 
|-id=563
| 19563 Brzezinska ||  || Bogna Natalia Brzezinska, a DCYSC awardee in 2003 || 
|-id=564
| 19564 Ajburnetti ||  || Anthony James Burnetti, a DCYSC awardee in 2003 || 
|-id=568
| 19568 Rachelmarie ||  || Rachel Marie Clements, a DCYSC awardee in 2003 || 
|-id=570
| 19570 Jessedouglas ||  || Jesse Douglas (1897–1965), American mathematician || 
|-id=572
| 19572 Leahmarie ||  || Leah Marie Crowder, a DCYSC awardee in 2003 || 
|-id=573
| 19573 Cummings ||  || Ian Douglas Cummings, a DCYSC awardee in 2003 || 
|-id=574
| 19574 Davidedwards ||  || David Kitzmiller Edwards V, a DCYSC awardee in 2003 || 
|-id=575
| 19575 Feeny ||  || Dana Anne Feeny, a DCYSC awardee in 2003 || 
|-id=577
| 19577 Bobbyfisher ||  || Bobby Drake Fisher, a DCYSC awardee in 2003 || 
|-id=578
| 19578 Kirkdouglas || 1999 MO || Kirk Douglas (1916–2020), American actor || 
|-id=582
| 19582 Blow ||  || Graham L. Blow (born 1954), New Zealand astronomer and award-winning photographer || 
|-id=584
| 19584 Sarahgerin ||  || Sarah H. Gerin, a DCYSC awardee in 2003 || 
|-id=585
| 19585 Zachopkins ||  || Zachary Harvey Hopkins, a DCYSC awardee in 2003 || 
|-id=587
| 19587 Keremane ||  || Sravya Ramadugu Keremane, a DCYSC awardee in 2003 || 
|-id=589
| 19589 Kirkland ||  || Tyler Hollis Kirkland, a DCYSC awardee in 2003 || 
|-id=591
| 19591 Michaelklein ||  || Michael Aaron Klein, a DCYSC awardee in 2003 || 
|-id=593
| 19593 Justinkoh ||  || Justin Koh, a DCYSC awardee in 2003 || 
|-id=595
| 19595 Lafer-Sousa ||  || Luis Lafer-Sousa, a DCYSC awardee in 2003 || 
|-id=596
| 19596 Spegorlarson ||  || Spencer Gordon Larson, a DCYSC awardee in 2003 || 
|-id=597
| 19597 Ryanlee ||  || Ryan Thomas Lee, a DCYSC awardee in 2003 || 
|-id=598
| 19598 Luttrell ||  || Jeffrey Michael Luttrell, a DCYSC awardee in 2003 || 
|-id=599
| 19599 Brycemelton ||  || Bryce Michael Melton, a DCYSC awardee in 2003 || 
|}

19601–19700 

|-id=602
| 19602 Austinminor ||  || Austin Lee Minor, a DCYSC awardee in 2003 || 
|-id=603
| 19603 Monier ||  || Elizabeth Nicole Monier, a DCYSC awardee in 2003 || 
|-id=612
| 19612 Noordung || 1999 OO || Herman Potočnik (1892–1929), a Slovene engineer and pioneer of cosmonautics, who was the first to describe a space station in a geostationary orbit and its applications under the pseudonym of Hermann Noordung in 1928 † || 
|-id=614
| 19614 Montelongo ||  || Michael John Montelongo, a DCYSC awardee in 2003 || 
|-id=617
| 19617 Duhamel ||  || Jean-Marie Constant Duhamel (1797–1872), a French applied mathematician, known for Duhamel's principle in the field of partial differential equations || 
|-id=618
| 19618 Maša ||  || Maša Kandušer (born 1964) of the University of Ljubljana, Slovenia, who inspired the discoverer Jure Skvarč || 
|-id=619
| 19619 Bethbell || 1999 QA || Beth Bell, daughter of American discoverer Graham E. Bell || 
|-id=620
| 19620 Auckland || 1999 QG || Auckland, the largest city in New Zealand || 
|-id=625
| 19625 Ovaitt ||  || Elena Kurtz Ovaitt (born 1989), a DCYSC awardee in 2003 || 
|-id=629
| 19629 Serra ||  || Guy Serra (1947–2000), a Catalan astrophysicist and doctoral advisor of French discoverer Alain Klotz || 
|-id=630
| 19630 Janebell ||  || Jane Bell (born 1945), wife of American discoverer Graham E. Bell || 
|-id=631
| 19631 Greensleeves ||  || Greensleeves, 16th-century traditional English folk song || 
|-id=633
| 19633 Rusjan ||  || Édvard Rúsjan (1886–1911), a pioneering Slovene aircraft designer and pilot || 
|-id=637
| 19637 Presbrey ||  || Scott Thomas Presbrey, a DCYSC awardee in 2003 || 
|-id=638
| 19638 Johngenereid ||  || John Gene Reid, a DCYSC awardee in 2003 || 
|-id=640
| 19640 Ethanroth ||  || Ethan Michael Roth, a DCYSC awardee in 2003 || 
|-id=643
| 19643 Jacobrucker ||  || Jacob Jeffrey Rucker, a DCYSC awardee in 2003 || 
|-id=652
| 19652 Saris ||  || Patrick J. G. Saris, a DCYSC awardee in 2003 || 
|-id=656
| 19656 Simpkins ||  || Taylor Simpkins, a DCYSC awardee in 2003 || 
|-id=658
| 19658 Sloop ||  || Katie Michelle Sloop, a DCYSC awardee in 2003 || 
|-id=660
| 19660 Danielsteck ||  || Daniel D'Andrea Steck, a DCYSC awardee in 2003 || 
|-id=662
| 19662 Stunzi ||  || Joseph Robert Stunzi, a DCYSC awardee in 2003 || 
|-id=663
| 19663 Rykerwatts ||  || Ryker H. Watts, a DCYSC awardee in 2003 || 
|-id=664
| 19664 Yancey ||  || Bryan D. Yancey, a DCYSC awardee in 2003 || 
|-id=676
| 19676 Ofeliaguilar ||  || Ofelia Aguilar, mentor at the DCYSC in 2003 || 
|-id=678
| 19678 Belczyk ||  || Pamela Belczyk, mentor at the DCYSC in 2003 || 
|-id=679
| 19679 Gretabetteo ||  || Greta Betteo, mentor at the DCYSC in 2003 || 
|-id=691
| 19691 Iwate ||  || The Japanese Iwate Prefecture, the country's second largest prefecture, located in northern Honshu || 
|-id=694
| 19694 Dunkelman ||  || Lawrence Dunkelman (1917–2002), an American optical researcher and pioneer in the development of ultraviolet detectors at Naval Research Laboratory and Goddard Space Flight Center, which he applied to astronomical and geophysical problems † || 
|-id=695
| 19695 Billnye ||  || Bill Nye (born 1955), an American science educator, television presenter, and mechanical engineer, best known for his TV program Bill Nye the Science Guy || 
|-id=700
| 19700 Teitelbaum ||  || Hugh E. Teitelbaum (1951–2007) received a degree in criminal justice from Northeastern University and a Law Degree from George Mason University. || 
|}

19701–19800 

|-
| 19701 Aomori ||  || Aomori Prefecture, Japan, is located in northernmost Tohoku Region, Honshu || 
|-id=704
| 19704 Medlock ||  || Kevin Medlock (born 1954) is a Californian award-winning telescope and instrument maker known for large aperture, research-grade telescopes || 
|-id=707
| 19707 Tokunai ||  || Tokunai Mogami (1755–1836) explored the northern area of Japan and learned astronomy, surveying and navigation from Toshiaki Honda, a Dutch scholar. He was engaged in the investigation and development of Hokkaido, Kurile Islands and Sakhalin. || 
|-id=711
| 19711 Johnaligawesa ||  || John N.L. Aligawesa (1949–1999) was a telecommunications lecturer at the Dares-salaam Institute of Technology (DIT) in Tanzania. || 
|-id=713
| 19713 Ibaraki ||  || The Japanese prefecture of Ibaraki houses three research centers (Tsukuba, Tokai and Kashima) that contain more than 300 research institutes || 
|-id=718
| 19718 Albertjarvis ||  || Albert G. Jarvis (1911–1996) invented fasteners for industry and the machines to produce them. In addition to being an inventor he was also a good friend and neighbor, always ready to help repair a neighbor's home or farm machinery, or help a teenager build a science project or rebuild his or her first automobile || 
|-id=719
| 19719 Glasser ||  || William Glasser (born 1925), a psychiatrist who developed the concepts of Choice Theory and Reality Therapy || 
|-id=721
| 19721 Wray ||  || James D. Wray (born 1936) directed the Institute of Meteoritics (1966–1967) and was deputy P.I. for NASA Skylab Experiment S-019 (1969–1980) || 
|-id=727
| 19727 Allen ||  || Clabon Walter Allen, Australian solar physicist || 
|-id=730
| 19730 Machiavelli ||  || Niccolò Machiavelli (1469–1527), a Florentine statesman, Italian political theorist and writer who advocated a strong central government || 
|-id=731
| 19731 Tochigi ||  || Tochigi, a Japanese prefecture north of Tokyo || 
|-id=738
| 19738 Calinger ||  || Manetta Calinger, mentor at the DCYSC in 2003 || 
|-id=741
| 19741 Callahan ||  || Diane Callahan, mentor at the DCYSC in 2003 || 
|-id=754
| 19754 Paclements ||  || Pauline Clements, mentor at the DCYSC in 2003 || 
|-id=758
| 19758 Janelcoulson ||  || Janel Opal Coulson, mentor at the DCYSC in 2003 || 
|-id=762
| 19762 Lacrowder ||  || Lee Ann Crowder, mentor at the DCYSC in 2003 || 
|-id=763
| 19763 Klimesh || 2000 MC || Matthew Klimesh (born 1968) developed the efficient data compressor for archiving the voluminous NEAT data. He has been with the Communications Systems and Research Section at Caltech's Jet Propulsion Laboratory since 1996. His research interests include data compression, rate-distortion theory and channel coding. || 
|-id=766
| 19766 Katiedavis ||  || Katie Davis, mentor at the DCYSC in 2003 || 
|-id=768
| 19768 Ellendoane ||  || Ellen Doane, mentor at the DCYSC in 2003 || 
|-id=769
| 19769 Dolyniuk ||  || William Dolyniuk, mentor at the DCYSC in 2003 || 
|-id=775
| 19775 Medmondson || 2000 PY || Matthew Edmondson, mentor at the DCYSC in 2003 || 
|-id=776
| 19776 Balears ||  || The people of the western Mediterranean group of islands Mallorca, Menorca, Ibiza and Formentera, known as the Balears (or Balearic Islands), have a distinct culture and history. || 
|-id=778
| 19778 Louisgarcia ||  || Louis Garcia, mentor at the DCYSC in 2003 || 
|-id=783
| 19783 Antoniromanya ||  || Father Antonio Romañá, S.J. (Antonio Romañá Pujó; 1900–1981), a Spanish mathematician and astronomer of Catalan origin and director of the Ebro Observatory † ‡ || 
|-id=787
| 19787 Betsyglass ||  || Betsy Glass, mentor at the DCYSC in 2003 || 
|-id=788
| 19788 Hunker ||  || Roxanne Hunker, mentor at the DCYSC in 2003 || 
|-id=789
| 19789 Susanjohnson ||  || Susan Johnson, mentor at the DCYSC in 2003 || 
|}

19801–19900 

|-
| 19801 Karenlemmon ||  || Karen Lemmon, mentor at the DCYSC in 2003 || 
|-id=806
| 19806 Domatthews ||  || Donna Matthews, mentor at the DCYSC in 2003 || 
|-id=808
| 19808 Elainemccall ||  || Elaine McCall, mentor at the DCYSC in 2003 || 
|-id=809
| 19809 Nancyowen ||  || Nancy Owen, mentor at the DCYSC in 2003 || 
|-id=810
| 19810 Partridge ||  || Mary Partridge, mentor at the DCYSC in 2003 || 
|-id=811
| 19811 Kimperkins ||  || Kimberly Perkins, mentor at the DCYSC in 2003 || 
|-id=813
| 19813 Ericsands ||  || Eric Sands, mentor at the DCYSC in 2003 || 
|-id=815
| 19815 Marshasega ||  || Marsha Sega, mentor at the DCYSC in 2003 || 
|-id=816
| 19816 Wayneseyfert ||  || Wayne Seyfert, mentor at the DCYSC in 2003 || 
|-id=817
| 19817 Larashelton ||  || Lara Shelton, mentor at the DCYSC in 2003 || 
|-id=818
| 19818 Shotwell ||  || Gary Shotwell, mentor at the DCYSC in 2003 || 
|-id=820
| 19820 Stowers ||  || Josh Stowers, mentor at the DCYSC in 2003 || 
|-id=821
| 19821 Caroltolin ||  || Carol Tolin, mentor at the DCYSC in 2003 || 
|-id=822
| 19822 Vonzielonka ||  || Beverley vonZielonka, mentor at the DCYSC in 2003 || 
|-id=826
| 19826 Patwalker ||  || Pat Walker, mentor at the DCYSC in 2003 || 
|-id=833
| 19833 Wickwar ||  || Steve Wickwar, mentor at the DCYSC in 2003 || 
|-id=835
| 19835 Zreda ||  || Grazyna Zreda, mentor at the DCYSC in 2003 || 
|-id=848
| 19848 Yeungchuchiu || 2000 TR || At absolute magnitude 11.7, this largest minor planet found by the discoverer, just 1.2 degrees west of Jupiter, is named in honor of his father, Chu Chiu Yeung (born 1925), for his unconditional support. || 
|-id=852
| 19852 Jamesalbers ||  || James J. Albers (born 1965), a systems engineer. || 
|-id=853
| 19853 Ichinomiya ||  || Ichinomiya, a Japanese high school in Ichinomiya City, Aichi Prefecture || 
|-id=855
| 19855 Borisalexeev ||  || Boris Alexeev (born 1987), ISTS awardee in 2004 || 
|-id=857
| 19857 Amandajane ||  || Amanda Jennifer Jane Robinson is a student of psychology at the University of Kansas and an empathetic caregiver to those in need of emotional support. She is the daughter of the discoverer. || 
|-id=860
| 19860 Anahtar ||  || Melis Nuray Anahtar (born 1986), ISTS awardee in 2004 || 
|-id=861
| 19861 Auster ||  || Craig Louis Auster (born 1986), ISTS awardee in 2004 || 
|-id=872
| 19872 Chendonghua || 6097 P-L || Donghua Chen (born 1948) of Gulangyu, Xiamen, a Chinese surgeon and active amateur astronomer || 
|-id=873
| 19873 Chentao || 6632 P-L || Tao Chen (born 1980) of Suzhou, Jiangsu, Chinese amateur astronomer and co-discoverer comet C/2008 C1 (Chen-Gao) || 
|-id=874
| 19874 Liudongyan || 6775 P-L || Dongyan Liu (born 1987) of Suzhou, Jiangsu, a Chinese student majoring in English at Suzhou University, who served as interpreter for the International Workshop on Cometary Astronomy and a total solar eclipse expedition in China in July 2009 || 
|-id=875
| 19875 Guedes || 6791 P-L || Leandro Lage dos Santos Guedes (born 1976), a Brazilian astronomer at the Rio de Janeiro planetarium, helped to organize the fifth International Workshop on Cometary Astronomy in 2009 || 
|}

19901–20000 

|-id=911
| 19911 Rigaux || 1933 FK || Fernand Rigaux (1905–1962) was a Belgian astronomer at the Royal Observatory, Uccle, who discovered several asteroids (including the one that now bears his name). || 
|-id=912
| 19912 Aurapenenta ||  || AURA penanta, for the fiftieth anniversary (penanta is 50 in modern Greek) of the Association of Universities for Research in Astronomy (AURA) || 
|-id=913
| 19913 Aigyptios ||  || Aigyptios, father of the hero Antiphos, a companion of Odysseus || 
|-id=914
| 19914 Klagenfurt ||  || Klagenfurt, Kaernten, Austria || 
|-id=915
| 19915 Bochkarev ||  || Nikolay Gennadievich Bochkarev (born 1947), Russian astronomer || 
|-id=916
| 19916 Donbass ||  || The Donetskij coal basin is located mainly in Ukraine and partly in Russia. || 
|-id=917
| 19917 Dazaifu ||  || The Dazaifu government office was in charge of the Kyushu area and the two islands of Iki and Tsushima in the second half of the 7th century. It was a base of defense and diplomatic relations at that time. The corner stones of the remains of the capital towers 'tofuro' remain in Dazaifu city. || 
|-id=918
| 19918 Stavby || 1977 PB || Stavby is a small village outside Uppsala. Stavby's church was started in the mid–13th century and there are still extant frescoes from the 1490s on its walls and vault. || 
|-id=919
| 19919 Pogorelov ||  || Aleksey Vasil'evich Pogorelov (1919–2002), a Ukrainian Soviet mathematician, was responsible for the solution of a number of key problems in geometry "as a whole", in the fundamentals of geometry, in the theory of the Monge-Ampère equation and in the geometrical theory of thin elastic shells || 
|-id=952
| 19952 Ashkinazi ||  || Alexey Alexandrovich Ashkinazi (born 1949) is deputy director for capital construction at CrAO. For 39 years he was engaged in the construction and repair of the Observatory's telescopes and residential buildings, as well as the construction of communication lines to the outside world || 
|-id=953
| 19953 Takeo ||  || Takeo, Saga is a city in Saga prefecture on Kyushu island in Japan, surrounded by mountains. || 
|-id=954
| 19954 Shigeyoshi ||  || Shigeyoshi Nabeshima (1800–1862) was the 28th lord of Takeo area, Saga domain in the 19th century. He imported globes and astronomical telescopes, and introduced foreign studies including astronomy. He is respected as a local hero, called Shigeyoshi-kou in Takeo. || 
|-id=955
| 19955 Hollý ||  || Ján Hollý, Slovak poet, translator, and catholic priest † || 
|-id=962
| 19962 Martynenko ||  || Vasily Vasil'evich Martynenko (1930–2000) was a researcher of meteor streams, an organizer of annual meteor expeditions and author of many papers and books. He organized an observatory for young amateurs in Simferopol, a studio of space paintings and a mineralogical museum || 
|-id=968
| 19968 Palazzolascaris ||  || "Palazzo Lascaris" the historical home of Council of the Piedmont Region, which has promoted the culture of science, scientific knowledge, research and teaching, notably the development of initiatives with the Astrophysical Observatory of Turin. || 
|-id=969
| 19969 Davidfreedman || 1988 PR || David A. Freedman (1938–2008), American statistician, 2003 recipient of the National Academy of Sciences' Carty Award || 
|-id=970
| 19970 Johannpeter ||  || Johann Peter Hebel (1760–1826), German evangelical theologian and author of Allemannische Gedichte and Schatzkästlein des rheinischen Hausfreundes || 
|-id=980
| 19980 Barrysimon ||  || Barry Simon (born 1952), a first-rate amateur astronomer, founded the Deep South Regional Stargaze in 1983 and has managed it since then. || 
|-id=981
| 19981 Bialystock ||  || Białystok, Poland || 
|-id=982
| 19982 Barbaradoore || 1990 BJ || Barbara Hendricks Doore (born 1933) is a cousin of the discoverer. || 
|-id=983
| 19983 Inagekiyokazu || 1990 DW || Kiyokazu Inage (born 1950) is a Japanese amateur astronomer and popularizer of astronomy in Kagawa Prefecture. His main interests are nebulae, star clusters, solar eclipses and deep space observations, and he is well known for his beautiful stellar photographs. || 
|-id=992
| 19992 Schönbein ||  || Christian Friedrich Schönbein, German chemist † || 
|-id=993
| 19993 Günterseeber ||  || Günter Seeber (born 1941), a German geodesist || 
|-id=994
| 19994 Tresini ||  || Domenico Trezzini (c. 1670–1734), a Swiss architect and engineer, who worked in St. Petersburg, Russia, beginning in 1703 and is regarded as the city's first architect. He built the Peter and Paul fortress, the Summer Palace of Peter I and the House of 12 Boards, which now houses St. Petersburg University. || 
|-id=998
| 19998 Binoche ||  || Juliette Binoche (born 1964) became world-famous for her performance in The Unbearable Lightness of Being (1988), a movie based on Milan Kundera's novel (1984) || 
|-id=999
| 19999 Depardieu ||  || Gérard Depardieu (born 1948) and his son Guillaume Depardieu (1971–2008). French actors. || 
|-id=000
| 20000 Varuna ||  || Varuna is one of the oldest of the vedic deities, the maker and upholder of heaven and earth. As such he is king of gods and men and the universe, and he has unlimited knowledge. || 
|}

References 

019001-020000